2010 Kurram agency mass kidnapping happened on May 15, 2010, in Kurram Agency in Federally Administered Tribal Areas of Pakistan. 60 people including women and children were kidnapped by militants dressed in police uniforms.

Background
Kurram has been a Taliban stronghold for many years. It has also been the site of sectarian violence between Shias and Sunnis. A large number of militants are thought to have fled to Kurram agency from South Waziristan last year after the military launched an operation there. Security forces had recently launched intense air strikes on militants in Kurram and adjoining areas.

Kidnappings
The kidnappers were dressed in police uniforms. Four people were initially abducted from a vehicle belonging to a government power utility.  The vehicle was then set on fire. Later 57 more civilians were taken from a convoy going to Parachinar.  50 hostages were released on 16 May 2010. Negotiations for release of remaining hostages were ongoing.

Responsibility
No group has yet claimed responsibility. Government sources have stated that an investigation is under way and efforts are being made to recover the kidnapped people. The government blamed the Taliban for the kidnapping.

See also
List of kidnappings
List of solved missing person cases: post-2000
Terrorism in Pakistan
War in North-West Pakistan

References

2010 crimes in Pakistan
2010s missing person cases
Crime in Khyber Pakhtunkhwa
Formerly missing people
History of Khyber Pakhtunkhwa
Kidnappings in Pakistan
Kurram District
Missing person cases in Pakistan